The following is a list of notable events and releases of the year 1962 in Norwegian music.

Events

May
 The 10th Bergen International Festival started in Bergen, Norway.

July
 The 2nd Moldejazz started in Molde, Norway.

Deaths

 March
 20 – Johan Evje, composer and teacher (born 1874).

 April
 24 – Finn Bø, songwriter, revue writer, playwright, journalist and theatre critic (born 1893).

 June
 24 – Alf Andersen, flautist (born 1928).

 December
 7 – Kirsten Flagstad, operatic soprano (born 1895).

Births

 February
 25 – Snorre Bjerck, jazz percussionist and singer.

 March
 31 – Morten Mølster, guitarist, The September When (died 2013).

 May
 9 – Jon Klette, jazz saxophonist and label Jazzaway Records manager (died 2016).

 October
 3 – Torgeir Vassvik, Sami musician and composer.
 12 – Mads Eriksen, guitarist and composer.
 20 – Bendik Hofseth, jazz saxophonist, singer, and composer.
 22 – Kjetil Saunes, bassist, composer, and songwriter.

 November
 1 – Magne Furuholmen, musician and visual artist.
 17 – Ole Evenrud, pop artist and teenpop producer.

 December
 8 – Olaf Kamfjord, jazz bassist and composer.
 15 – Nils Einar Vinjor, jazz guitarist and composer.

 Unknown date
 Tor Haugerud, jazz drummer and percussionist (Transjoik, BOL).

See also
 1962 in Norway
 Music of Norway

References

 
Norwegian music
Norwegian
Music
1960s in Norwegian music